Turnera ulmifolia, the ramgoat dashalong or yellow alder, is a species of plant of family Passifloraceae, native to Mexico and the West Indies. A recent study found that yellow alder potentiated the antibiotic activity against methicillin-resistant Staphylococcus aureus (MRSA).

Description 

Turnera ulmifolia grows erect, with dark toothed leaves and small, yellow-orange flowers, and is often found as a weed growing on roadsides. These yellow flowers bloom around 6:00 am and wilt around 11:30 AM. Life span for flower is around 6 hours. These plants can survive on minimum water and grow on walls, cement blocks, and rocks. Tawny Coster (Acraea terpsicore) butterfly larvae feed on these plants. 
This plant is commonly misidentified with the closely related T. diffusa in horticultural commerce, causing it to be often misrepresented as "Damiana."

References

ulmifolia
Plants described in 1753
Taxa named by Carl Linnaeus